is a Japanese anthology manga series written and illustrated by Seiman Douman. It was serialized in Shogakukan's seinen manga magazine Monthly Ikki from September 2010 to August 2014, with its chapters collected in three tankōbon volumes.

Publication
It is an anthology collection of 39 stories that span a wide range of genres. It was serialized in Shogakukan's seinen manga magazine Monthly Ikki from September 25, 2010, to August 25, 2014. Shogakukan collected the chapters in three tankōbon volumes, released from January 30, 2012, to September 30, 2014.

Volume list

Reception
Nickelodeon was one of the Jury Recommended Works at the 18th Japan Media Arts Festival in 2014.

See also
How Many Light-Years to Babylon?, another manga series by the same author
The Voynich Hotel, another manga series by the same author

References

External links
Nickelodeon at Ikki Paradise 

Manga anthologies
Seinen manga
Shogakukan manga